First Presbyterian Church is a historic Presbyterian church located at 301 N. Walnut Street in Seymour, Jackson County, Indiana.  It was completed in 1884, and is a one-story, Late Gothic Revival style brick church with a cross-axial plan.  It features a tall corner bell tower and large art glass windows measuring 18 feet wide by 22 feet high.

It was listed on the National Register of Historic Places in 1991.

References

Presbyterian churches in Indiana
Churches on the National Register of Historic Places in Indiana
Gothic Revival church buildings in Indiana
Residential buildings completed in 1884
Buildings and structures in Jackson County, Indiana
National Register of Historic Places in Jackson County, Indiana